David Karako (born February 11, 1945) is a former Israeli football defender who played for the Israel national team between 1968 and 1972, gaining 12 caps. He was part of the Israel squad for the 1970 World Cup.

At club level, Karako played for Maccabi Tel Aviv, Beitar Jerusalem and Hapoel Yehud,

After retiring, Karako coached Hapoel Yehud, Lazarus Holon and Hapoel Or Yehuda before returning to Hapoel Yehud for a second stint. Later Karako coached Hapoel Tayibe, Maccabi Herzliya and Hapoel Ramat Gan.

References

External links
 
 

1945 births
Living people
Israeli footballers
Association football defenders
Israel international footballers
Olympic footballers of Israel
Maccabi Tel Aviv F.C. players
Beitar Jerusalem F.C. players
Hapoel Yehud F.C. players
Footballers at the 1968 Summer Olympics
1968 AFC Asian Cup players
1970 FIFA World Cup players
Maccabi Herzliya F.C. managers
Hapoel Ramat Gan F.C. managers
Footballers from Jaffa
Israeli football managers